Mathew Knowles (born January 9, 1952) is an American record executive, businessman and university lecturer. He is best known for being the manager of Destiny's Child. He also once managed the solo careers of his daughters Beyoncé and Solange Knowles.

Knowles is the founder of Music World Entertainment, which embraces country, gospel and children's music.

Early life and education
Knowles was born in Gadsden, Alabama, the son of Lou Helen Knowles (née Hogue) and Matthew Q. Knowles (April 4, 1927 – December 30, 1996). He is a 1974 graduate of Fisk University in Nashville, Tennessee, where he earned both a Bachelor of Arts degree in Economics and a Bachelor of Science degree in Business Administration. He has an MBA in Strategic Planning and Organizational Culture from Cornerstone Christian Bible College.

Career
Knowles began his business career in sales of office and medical equipment. He moved to Houston in 1976 and worked for the Xerox Corporation for 10 years, primarily in the medical-systems sales division. Knowles worked selling CT/MRI diagnostic imaging equipment to hospitals and health facilities. He also worked in neurosurgical sales. In 1992, Knowles left this career to devote himself to his music company, Music World Entertainment, which he founded that year.

Knowles established several recording imprints under Music World Entertainment, including Music World Gospel, Music World Kids, and Music World Country/Compadre. Knowles also established joint ventures with Sony Music, Interscope/Geffen/A&M, Fontana/Universal, Integrity Africa, Fontana International, and Sony Brazil.

Knowles became manager of the vocal group Destiny's Child, working as either a producer or an executive producer on many of the group's projects. By 1997 he had secured the group a label deal with Columbia Records and a feature on the Men in Black soundtrack. During this time, Knowles brought in producers such as Wyclef Jean, Jermaine Dupri, and Master P to focus on a fusion of hip hop with R&B to cross over to different audiences.  Under Music World Artist Management, Destiny's Child became a top-selling group, winning several awards including the Grammy Award, the American Music Award, BET Awards, and many others. Billboard magazine inducted the group into the All Time Hot 100 Artists. Knowles also managed the solo careers of Destiny's Child members Michelle Williams and Kelly Rowland. Former members LeToya Luckett and LaTavia Roberson once sued Knowles, accusing him of misappropriating group funds.

In 2002, Knowles founded Spirit Rising Music, which became Music World Gospel. Its artists include Vanessa Bell Armstrong, Brian Courtney Wilson, Juanita Bynum, Le'Andria Johnson, Micah Stampley, Amber Bullock, Andrea Helms, Trinitee 5:7, and Elder Goldwire. In 2016, through Music World Music, Knowles acquired the country music catalog Compadre, which includes James McMurty, Johnny Cash, Billy Joe Shaver, Trent Willmon, and Kate Campbell. Knowles also launched the family-oriented music imprint, Music World Kids. The label has released youth projects that include Baby Jamz, Krazy Kuzins, Kid's Rap Radio, and the Music World Kids CD 5-pack. The venture also has released music from Nick Jr’s popular cartoon series, Wow! Wow! Wubbzy!.

In addition to his work in music, Knowles was one of the executive producers of the 2009 movie Obsessed, which starred Beyoncé. He was also executive producer of, and was featured in, two reality series: The UK's Chancers, and MTV International's Breaking From Above.

In October 2015, Mathew Knowles released his first book, "The DNA Of Achievers: 10 Traits of Highly Successful Professionals". In an interview with Madamenoire.com, he spoke about teaching entrepreneurship on the college level, and his entertainment industry seminar where he taught music executives like Van Benson and other successful students.

In March 2018, Knowles joined the advisory board of Tunedly, an online recording studio for songwriters.

In July 2019, Knowles joined the cannabis and real-estate firm Bangi as its chief marketing officer. On October 25, Knowles announced via an Instagram video that he would release an album featuring then-unreleased music from Destiny's Child's childhood days as Girls Tyme. The album, Destiny's Child: The Untold Story Presents Girls Tyme, was released on all streaming platforms and the iTunes Store on December 2, 2019. The album's release was also accompanied by a book, Destiny's Child: The Untold Story, written by Knowles.

In February 2021, Knowles launched his iHeartRadio podcast "Mathew Knowles Impact" and revealed his plans to retire from the music industry. 

In March 2022, Knowles sold Music World Entertainment Group to APX Capital Group. Upon signing this deal, he became a member of APX's board of directors, and the manager of a $275 million fund for film and television co-productions between the United States and Italy. One of the first projects under the agreement, The Mathew Knowles Story, will tell the story of how Knowles guided Destiny's Child to success, while also giving a behind-the-scenes look at the solo careers of his daughters Beyoncé and Solange, as well as Michelle Williams and Kelly Rowland.

Teaching
Knowles is a visiting professor at Texas Southern University, where he teaches courses on the entertainment industry in the School of Communications. In 2018, the university established the Mathew Knowles Institute in his honor. He currently holds a professorship at University of Houston, Prairie View A&M University, and the Art Institute. Knowles joined the teaching staff at London College of Creative Media as a visiting professor. In September 2022, a bursary scholarship was established in his name.

Personal life
Knowles married Tina Knowles in 1980. She filed for divorce in 2009, dropped the matter in 2010, then refiled in August 2011, stating "discord or conflict of personalities" that prevented them from "reasonable expectation of reconciliation" as the reason. The divorce was finalized in November 2011.
On June 30, 2013, he married former model Gena Avery.

In October 2019, Knowles announced he had been diagnosed with male breast cancer.

References

External links
 Official website

1952 births
Living people
African-American businesspeople
African-American record producers
Record producers from Texas
American music industry executives
American music managers
Beyoncé
Businesspeople from Alabama
Businesspeople from Texas
Fisk University alumni
People from Gadsden, Alabama
People from Houston
American salespeople
Texas Southern University faculty
Destiny's Child
African-American academics
African-American educators